Lonchopisthus is a genus of jawfishes native to the tropical West Atlantic (Caribbean Sea) and East Pacific oceans (Gulf of California).

Species
There are currently five recognized species in this genus:
 Lonchopisthus ancistrus Smith-Vaniz & Walsh, 2017 (Hook jawfish) 
 Lonchopisthus higmani Mead, 1959
 Lonchopisthus lemur (G. S. Myers, 1935)
 Lonchopisthus micrognathus (Poey, 1860) (Swordtail jawfish)
 Lonchopisthus sinuscalifornicus Castro-Aguirre & Villavicencio-Garayzar, 1988 (Longtailed jawfish)

References

Opistognathidae